Chris Maduabrochukwu Okolie (born 1949, died 2007) was a Nigerian concert promoter and publisher and who founded New Breed Organization, publishers of the now defunct New Breed magazine.

Life
Okolie started out as a music promoter in the late 1960s, promoting small shows at the J.K. Randle and YMCA halls in Lagos. He then briefly studied advertising at Watford College, London before returning to Nigeria.

In 1975, he established New Breed a biweekly news magazine published from Ogunlana Drive in Surulere. As the publisher, he sometimes came into conflict with military leaders in the country. In 1977, he was detained by authorities who did not like an article that was printed in the magazine. In June 1978, the government confiscated thousands of copies of the magazine and further imposed a ban on publication. The magazine resumed publication in 1987, 9 years after the ban.

In 1992, he joined the political process and was a member and spokesperson of the Committee of National Consensus 1996 but later moved to the United Nigeria Congress Party (UNCP) in 1997.

He died on March 4, 2007, from complications related to a car accident in 2005. He is buried in Okpanam, Delta State.

References

2007 deaths
Nigerian journalists
1949 births